Prittlewell Square is a park situated in Southend-on-Sea, Essex, England overlooking the Thames Estuary. It is the oldest park in Southend-on-Sea.

The clock at the entrance to the Square was donated by local jeweller and philanthropist R A Jones. The Square lies within the Clifftown Conservation Area, which was designated in 1968 due to the historic and architectural significance of the area.

References

Buildings and structures in Southend-on-Sea
Gardens in Essex